Soul Martini is the second album by the American band the Cavedogs, released in 1992. "Boy in a Plastic Bubble" was released as a single. The band supported the album by touring with Material Issue. The Cavedogs broke up six months after the release of Soul Martini.

Production
Recorded at Ocean Way, the album was produced by Michael Beinhorn. The three bandmembers shared in the songwriting. "Sonny Day" is about road life during concert tours.

Critical reception

The Chicago Tribune wrote: "What makes this trio of pop fanatics from Boston so consistently interesting—their songs so inescapable—is the way they stand the history of rock on its head and rummage through the possibilities." The Calgary Herald noted that the "songs jump from trippy psychedelic dance tracks to loud 'n' proud industrial rockers."

The Orlando Sentinel concluded that "the Cavedogs are that increasing rarity—a group with real depth in its writing, and a truly adventurous approach to recording." The Washington Post deemed the album "energetic and accomplished but rather labored." The San Antonio Express-News considered the album to be "refined grunge pop, mixing abrasive guitars with catchy melodies with just the right dash of psychedelia."

Track listing
All songs were credited to Rivers, Spahr, and Stevens in that order.
Love Grenade  - 3:36  
Here Comes Rosie - 3:28  
Sorrow (Boots of Pain) - 4:23  
As You Were - 2:36  
Boy in a Plastic Bubble - 3:07  
You're Put Away (Folderol) - 5:25  
Sonny Day - 3:24  
I, I, I, - 3:25  
Murder - 3:02  
On for the Ride - 4:17  
Tarzan and His Arrowheads - 4:02  
Circus Song - 5:07

References

Cavedogs albums
1992 albums
Capitol Records albums
Albums produced by Michael Beinhorn